Mari Rabie (born 10 September 1986) is a South African triathlete who competed in the 2008 & 2016 Summer Olympics and the 2006 Commonwealth Games. 
Rabie was elected as a Rhodes Scholar for 2010. She graduated with a Masters in Applied Statistics from St Catherine's College Oxford in 2011 and an MBA at Oxford University in 2013 at Exeter College. She has completed her degree in Actuarial Science at the University of Stellenbosch in 2009 and attended Bloemhof Girls' High School in Stellenbosch.

In 2008, she finished 43rd in the Olympic triathlon event after suffering severe technical problems with her bike. She described Beijing as her "greatest disappointment ever", only once returning to International Competition with a 4th place in 2010.

Rabie returned to racing briefly between her two Oxford degrees with a 3rd-place finish at the World Xterra Championships in Maui, Hawaii in 2012.

She briefly returned to racing in 2014 and was diagnosed with myocarditis in June 2014, she resumed training in 2015 & qualified for the Rio Olympic Games where she finished 11th. She obtained her Oxford MBA in 2013.

Rabie retired from professional sport in October 2016.

Results

2016 results
11th Olympic Games Rio

2012 results
3rd Xterra World Championships

2010 results
1st South African Ironman 70.3
1st South African Xterra
South African Champion
4th ITU World Cup Triathlon, Monterrey Mexico

2008 results
All African Champion
South African Champion
3rd World U23 Triathlon Championships

References

External links
 profile

1986 births
Living people
South African female triathletes
Olympic triathletes of South Africa
Triathletes at the 2008 Summer Olympics
Triathletes at the 2016 Summer Olympics
Triathletes at the 2006 Commonwealth Games
Commonwealth Games competitors for South Africa
South African people of British descent
Alumni of St Catherine's College, Oxford
Alumni of Saïd Business School
South African Rhodes Scholars
20th-century South African women
21st-century South African women